is a Japanese professional basketball player for the JX-Eneos Sunflowers of the Women's Japan Basketball League (WJBL).

Career

WJBL
Tokashiki has played for the JX-Eneos Sunflowers, a team based in Kashiwa, since their 2010–11 season where she made her professional debut. In her opening season she led the Sunflowers to a championship as well as taking home Rookie of the Year, a place on the Best 5 team and the MVP award. She has enjoyed much success in this league and has led the Sunflowers to a championship each year since her debut.

WNBA
Tokashiki was signed by the Seattle Storm for the 2015 WNBA season. In her first year with the Storm, she made the WNBA All-Rookie Team. Tokashiki signed a multiyear deal with the Storm in 2016. She played with the Storm during the 2016 and 2017 seasons, but missed the 2018 season to focus on preparing for the 2018 FIBA Women's World Cup with the Japanese national team. As of November 2021, Tokashiki is not on a WNBA roster and has not played in the league since the 2017 season.

National Team
Tokashiki was chosen as the national athlete for in 2011, and in that year she participated in the 2011 FIBA Asia Championship for Women. She got FIBA Asia Championship MVP in 2013 and 2015, also winning the Championship on both occasions. She made her Olympic debut at the 2016 Summer Olympics in Rio de Janeiro, Brazil.

References

1991 births
Living people
Basketball players at the 2016 Summer Olympics
Japanese expatriate basketball people in the United States
Japanese people of American descent
Japanese women's basketball players
Olympic basketball players of Japan
Power forwards (basketball)
Seattle Storm players